Kislev or Chislev (Hebrew: כִּסְלֵו, Standard Kīslev Tiberian Kīslēw), also 'Chisleu' in the King James (authorized English) Bible, is the third month of the civil year and the ninth month of the ecclesiastical year on the Hebrew calendar. In the Babylonian calendar its name was Araḫ Kislimu.

In a regular (kesidran) year Kislev has 30 days, but because of the Rosh Hashanah postponement rules, in some years it can lose a day to make the year a "short" (chaser) year. Kislev is a month which occurs in November–December on the Gregorian calendar and is sometimes known as the month of dreams.
The name of the month derives from Akkadian kislimu. But some popular etymologies connect it to the Hebrew root K-S-L as in the words "kesel, kisla" (hope, positiveness) or "ksil" (Orion, a constellation that shines especially in this month) because of the expectation and hope for rains.

In Jewish Rabbinic literature, the month of Kislev is believed to correspond to the Tribe of Benjamin.

Holidays in Kislev
25 Kislev – 2 Tevet  – Hanukkah – ends 3 Tevet if Kislev is short

Kislev in Jewish history and tradition
 1 Kislev (1977) – Rabbi Menachem Mendel Schneerson miraculously recovered from a devastating heart attack.
 6 Kislev (1973) – Death of David Ben-Gurion
 8 Kislev (1978) – Death of Golda Meir 
 9 Kislev (1773) – Birth of the Mitteler Rebbe, the second Chabad Rebbe.
 9 Kislev (1827) – Death of the Mitteler Rebbe, the second Chabad Rebbe.
 10 Kislev (1826) – Liberation from prison of the Mitteler Rebbe, the second Chabad Rebbe.
 14 Kislev ( BCE) – Death of Reuben, son of Jacob.
 14 Kislev (c. 1568 BCE) – Birth of Reuben, son of Jacob.
 14 Kislev (1929) - Rabbi Menachem Mendel Schneersohn married Chaya Mushka Schneersohn, the daughter of the Sixth Lubavitcher Rebbe
 15 Kislev (167 BCE) – The Greeks set up the "Abomination of Desolation" in the Temple.
 17 Kislev (1947) – The United Nations General Assembly approves a plan for the partition of Palestine, which eventually led to the creation of the State of Israel.
 19 Kislev (1772) - Death of the Magid Of Mezritch, successor of the Baal Shem Tov.  
 19 Kislev (1798) – Liberation from prison of Rabbi Shneur Zalman of Liadi and celebrated as Yud Tes Kislev by Chabad Chassidim.
 20 Kislev (c. 457 BCE) – Ezra addresses a three-day assemblage of Jews in Jerusalem, telling them to adhere to the Torah and to dissolve their interfaith marriages.
  21 Kislev (c. 128 BCE) – The Samaritan temple at Mount Gerizim was destroyed by John Hyrcanus I.
  25 Kislev (164 BCE) – The Hanukkah miracle
 25 Kislev (167 BCE) The Greeks make pagan sacrifices in the Temple
 27 Kislev (c. 2105 BCE) – Flood rains cease (According to Genesis 6–8).

References in fiction
 In the story of Xenogears, Kislev is the name of a country, named after the Hebrew month.
 In the Warhammer universe, Kislev is both the name for a city near the chaos wastes and the country in which it resides. Kislev is modelled after a combination of 16th century Russia and Poland-Lithuania.
 In the Dragonlance universe, Kislev (or Chislev) represents the godly force of instinct.
 By Jon Stewart in "Can I Interest You in Hanukkah" from Stephen Colbert's A Colbert Christmas: The Greatest Gift of All!

See also 
 Jewish astrology

References

External links
 This Month in Jewish History
 Resources on the Month of Kislev

 
Months of the Hebrew calendar